Che Uda bin Che Nik (born 11 March 1949) is a Malaysian politician. He was the Member of the Parliament of Malaysia for the Sik constituency in the state of Kedah from 2008 to 2013.

Che Uda was elected to the Sik seat in the 2008 general election with a slim margin majority, defeating incumbent Othman Desa of the ruling Barisan Nasional coalition. Prior to his election, Che Uda was Deputy Director of the Kedah Department of Education. He served for one term only in the Parliament, before losing his seat in the 2013 general election to the Barisan Nasional's Mansor Abd Rahman.

Election results

References

Living people
1949 births
People from Kedah
Malaysian Islamic Party politicians
Malaysian people of Malay descent
Malaysian Muslims
Members of the Dewan Rakyat